Bajul castle is a historical castle located in Aligudarz County in Lorestan Province, The longevity of this fortress dates back to the Zand dynasty.

References 

Castles in Iran
Aligudarz County